Cathy Gauthier ( Tardi; June 5, 1961 in Winnipeg, Manitoba) is a Canadian curler and broadcaster.

Gauthier began curling in grade 9. She played juniors for one season with Connie Laliberte, losing in the Manitoba final one year.  

Gauthier joined back up with Laliberte in women's play, and was on her team for much of her career.  Gauthier won two championships with Laliberte, in 1992 and 1995, and won the 2005 Scott Tournament of Hearts with Jennifer Jones, playing lead.  Although she is one of the few women to win three championships on the national level, she has not won a world championship.  She left the Jones team in May 2005 due to family commitments.

Gauthier, who is regularly employed with the Canadian Government, also works as a curling broadcaster, having called games for TSN and Global TV in Winnipeg and Rogers Sportsnet nationally.

Gauthier is the mother of 2020 Canadian Junior Men's curling champion skip Jacques Gauthier and aunt of three-time Canadian junior champion Tyler Tardi.

References

External links
 

Curlers from Winnipeg
Curling broadcasters
Canadian women curlers
Living people
1961 births
Canadian women's curling champions